Kellogg Community College (KCC) is a public community college based in Battle Creek, Michigan, with sites in Battle Creek, Albion, Coldwater, Hastings and in the Fort Custer Industrial Park. It serves approximately 8,400 students annually via five campuses, customized training, and online coursework.

The KCC service district covers Barry, Branch and Calhoun counties in south central Michigan. The tax district includes most of Calhoun County and small portions of Barry, Branch, Hillsdale, Kalamazoo and St. Joseph counties. KCC, a nonprofit institution, is governed by a publicly elected Board of Trustees, which sets policy and budgeting priorities.

Academics
KCC is accredited by the Higher Learning Commission. The college offers 59 pre-professional transfer curricula; 35 associate degree programs; 28 certificate programs; six categories of professional certifications; and a variety of short-term, non-credit courses.

Athletics
Kellogg Community College offers six athletics programs including baseball, men's and women's basketball, men's and women's bowling, men's and women's cross country, women's soccer and women's volleyball. The teams compete as members of the Michigan Community College Athletic Association and Region 12 of the National Junior College Athletic Association (NJCAA).

Freedom of speech controversy
In September 2016, three people passed out copies of the U.S. constitutions on campus The students were a told to shut down the event on grounds that it violated the school's “speech permit policy." and were subsequently arrested by campus police for trespassing.

The YAL organization subsequently filed a lawsuit and the school agreed to pay a $55,000 settlement.

Notable alumni 
Josh McDowell, Christian apologist and evangelist

References

External links

Community colleges in Michigan
Michigan Community College Athletic Association
Battle Creek, Michigan
Two-year colleges in the United States
Educational institutions established in 1956
Education in Calhoun County, Michigan
Buildings and structures in Calhoun County, Michigan
Education in Branch County, Michigan
Buildings and structures in Branch County, Michigan
NJCAA athletics
Coldwater, Michigan
1956 establishments in Michigan
Albion, Michigan
Hastings, Michigan